Charlie Gubb is a New Zealand former professional rugby league footballer who last played for the Widnes Vikings in the Super League.

Early years
Gubb, of Māori descent, attended Wellington College and played for their first XV rugby union team before switching to rugby league in 2008, playing for the University Hunters club in the Wellington Rugby League competition. He signed with the New Zealand Warriors in 2010, turning down offers from the Manly Warringah Sea Eagles and the Wests Tigers.

Playing career
After signing with the New Zealand Warriors, Gubb played for their Toyota Cup (Under-20s) team in 2010. He played in 23 games during the season and came off the bench in the 2010 Toyota Cup Grand Final, which was won by the Warriors 42–28.

Following the 2010 season, Gubb moved to Australia and joined the Wynnum Manly Seagulls in the Queensland Cup. He was part of the Seagulls team that won the 2011 Queensland Cup grand final 16–10. In 2012, he was selected to play for the Queensland Residents team.

Gubb returned to Auckland in 2013 and trialled with the Warriors on a pre-season contract. Gubb earned a full-time contract with the club and spent the first half of the year playing NSW Cup with the Auckland Vulcans. His contract was extended until the end of 2014 in June and, after several games as 18th man, Gubb was named to make his first grade debut for the Warriors on 7 July 2013 after Russell Packer withdrew due to injury.

In 2018, Gubb joined the Canberra Raiders but halfway through the season signed with English club Leigh Centurions.  On July 27, 2018, Gubb's move to Leigh fell through due to financial reasons, Gubb then signed a contract to join the Widnes Vikings instead.

On 4 March 2019, Gubb announced his retirement from Rugby League at the age of 28 to pursue a career as a teacher back in his home country of New Zealand.

References

External links
Canberra Raiders profile
New Zealand Warriors profile
NRL profile

1990 births
Living people
Auckland rugby league team players
Canberra Raiders players
New Zealand Māori rugby league players
New Zealand Māori rugby league team players
New Zealand rugby league players
New Zealand schoolteachers
New Zealand Warriors players
People educated at Wellington College (New Zealand)
Rugby league players from Wellington City
Rugby league props
Widnes Vikings players
Wynnum Manly Seagulls players